Kuchekeh Shiravand (also Romanized as Kūchekeh Shīrāvand; also known as Shīrāvand-e Soflá) is a village in Darb-e Gonbad Rural District, Darb-e Gonbad District, Kuhdasht County, Lorestan Province, Iran. At the 2006 census, its population was 909, in 167 families.

References 

Towns and villages in Kuhdasht County